HM Prison Wymott is a Category C men's prison near Leyland, Lancashire, England. Wymott is operated by His Majesty's Prison Service, and is next to HMP Garth. The prison has facilities for housing sex offenders, in addition to inmates sentenced for mainstream offences.

History
Wymott Prison opened in 1979 as short term category C prison. In 1986, there was a large prison riot at Wymott which caused serious damage to the fabric of living units of the jail. In 1993, another major riot left the prison on the brink of total evacuation. Two wings were demolished and replaced with new units as a result of the damage, whilst the remaining original wings were refurbished and turned into sex offender accommodation.

The prison today
Wymott is a Category C prison for adult males. The prison also has facilities for vulnerable prisoners (mainly sex offenders). VPs are housed in units A, B, F, G, & I wings. VPs and Cat C’s cook the food for the entire prison and work at tailoring & printing duties, as well as the canteen shop for all local prisons.

The prison works in partnership with Leyland Trucks in training prisoners in key skills in preparation for possible employment such as interview techniques, CV preparation, and aptitude and personality questionnaires. It also has a 70-place Therapeutic Community, which operates independently of the prison itself and aims to help inmates remain drug-free after their release.

Notable inmates
 Ched Evans, Welsh international footballer, convicted of rape in 2012 and jailed for five years. Released 17 October 2014.
 Stuart Hall, BBC sports presenter and former It's a Knockout host. Released 16 December 2015.

References

External links
 Ministry of Justice pages on Wymott
 Criminal Information Bureau information on HMP Wymott

Wymott
Wymott
1979 establishments in England
Buildings and structures in the Borough of Chorley